The Australia–South Korea football rivalry is a sports rivalry that exists between the national association football teams of both Australia and South Korea. The rivalry is one of the most followed competitive rivalries in Asian football.

Historical origin
South Korea first faced Australia in 1967 during a tour to South Vietnam playing a game in the 1967 South Vietnam Independence Cup. In this encounter, Australia beat South Korea 3–2 before eventually winning the friendly tournament. It was this friendly competition that the nickname of the Australian side, "Socceroos", was born.

Just two years later they met in the first round of qualification for the 1970 FIFA World Cup in a group that included Japan. All the games were played in South Korea and Australia topped the group progressing to the next round before losing to Israel.

The two teams were to meet again in the final round of the 1974 World Cup qualifiers in late 1973 and on this occasion, the winner would progress to the 1974 FIFA World Cup. The teams first met in Sydney on 28 October 1973 and played out a nil-all draw. The second leg was in Seoul on 10 November 1973. South Korea scored early in the 15th minute and then again in the 27th minute. However, Australia were to quickly reply with a goal by Branko Buljevic just two minutes later. Shortly after half time, Ray Baartz equalised. The score remained two-all at full time. As this was prior to the introduction of the away goals rule a third match was hastily arranged and, just three days later they met in Hong Kong. Jimmy Mackay scored the only goal of the match resulting in Australia qualifying for their first World Cup Finals.

In 1977 they were to meet again in a five team group for qualification to the 1978 FIFA World Cup. Australia won one and drew one, although neither were to proceed.

When South Korea won a penalty shoot-out on 21 June 1987 in the President's Cup it was the first time that the Koreans had defeated Australia although it wasn't until 6 September 1990 in a friendly in Seoul that South Korea had won during regulation time. It was the 14th meeting between the two countries.

During the 1990s they played a number of friendly matches and then met in the 2001 FIFA Confederations Cup which was hosted in Korea. South Korea won the match 1–0 which gave them their first competitive victory over Australia although South Korea would not qualify to the knockout stage whereas Australia would. After Australia entered the Asian Football Confederation in 2006 the two teams had to wait until the 2011 AFC Asian Cup before they met again in a competitive fixture. On this occasion the match finished 1–1 in the group stage in Qatar.

They were to be drawn again in the same group when Australia hosted the 2015 AFC Asian Cup with Korea inflicting Australia's only defeat in the tournament, 1–0 in Brisbane, which was also South Korea's first ever win against Australia in Australia. However, Australia won a dramatic final in extra time in Sydney in front of a crowd of 76,385. Massimo Luongo scored just prior to half time. In second half injury time Son Heung-min equalised for the Koreans taking the match into extra time. James Troisi then scored the winner for Australia to claim their first Asian Cup.

Australia and South Korea are two of only five Asian national teams to have reached the knockout stage of the FIFA World Cup. Likewise, they are also two countries to have won the AFC Asian Cup. Both Australia and South Korea are also successful in other major competitions: Australia was one of only three AFC teams to have reached the final of a senior FIFA competition, in 1997 FIFA Confederations Cup; while Australia and South Korea's youth teams were also finalists in FIFA U-17 World Cup and FIFA U-20 World Cup.

List of matches

The following fixtures are considered 'A' Internationals by Football Australia only and are included in Australia's official statistics with regard to matches played, caps, records etc.

Statistics

Head-to-head record

Top goalscorers

See also
Australia men's national soccer team all-time record
South Korea national football team records and statistics
Australia–South Korea relations

References

External links
What is the Socceroos' greatest football rivalry?
World Football Elo Ratings: Australia
World Football Elo Ratings: South Korea

Australia national soccer team rivalries
South Korea national football team rivalries
Australia–South Korea relations
Australia national soccer team results
International association football rivalries
1967 establishments in Asia